The Houston Symphony is an American orchestra based in Houston, Texas.  The orchestra is resident at the Jesse H. Jones Hall for the Performing Arts.

History
The first concert of what was to become the Houston Symphony took place on June 21, 1913, sponsored by the Houston philanthropist Ima Hogg.  Initially, the orchestra was composed of only 35 part-time musicians.  Despite its small stature and budget, the orchestra and its first conductor, Julien Paul Blitz, enjoyed a good response and continued to perform. He conducted until 1916, then Paul Bergé, until the orchestra disbanded in 1918.

The orchestra reformed in 1930, still as a semi-professional orchestra, and gave its first full season of concerts the following year conducted by Uriel Nespoli.  In the spring of 1936 the symphony society officially became the Houston Symphony Society.  Ernst Hoffmann began his tenure that year with increased support from the Society and began hiring professional musicians. The orchestra continued to expand over the next several decades, and its first 52-week contract was signed in 1971.

Leopold Stokowski was music director from 1955 to 1961.  During his tenure, the Houston Symphony gave the American premiere of the Symphony no. 11 of Dmitri Shostakovich, and subsequently made the first commercial recording of the work.  When Stokowski invited African-American opera singer Shirley Verrett to sing with the Houston Symphony in the early 1960s, he was forced to rescind his invitation when the orchestra board refused to accept a black soloist. Stokowski later made amends by giving her a prestigious date with the Philadelphia Orchestra.

The orchestra performed in either the City Auditorium or the Music Hall until the construction in 1966 of the Jesse H. Jones Hall for the Performing Arts.  In 2001, the orchestra lost millions of dollars' worth of instruments, music, and archives when Tropical Storm Allison flooded the basement levels of Jones Hall.  In 2003, the musicians went on strike for 24 days, and the settlement included a pay cut for the musicians and a reduction in the size of the orchestra.

Hans Graf was the music director of the orchestra from 2001 to 2013, the longest tenure of any Houston Symphony music director.  In September 2009, the orchestra announced the conclusion of his tenure as music director at the end of the 2012–2013 season, upon which Graf took the title of conductor laureate of the orchestra.

Andrés Orozco-Estrada became music director in September 2014, with an initial contract of five years.  In March 2017, the orchestra announced an extension of Orozco-Estrada's contract through the 2021–2022 season.  Orozco-Estrada and the orchestra have recorded commercially for the PENTATONE label.  Orozco-Estrada concluded his Houston music directorship at the close of the 2021–2022 season.  

Juraj Valčuha first guest-conducted the orchestra in 2011.  He returned as a guest conductor twice, in April 2018 and in March 2021.  In July 2021, the orchestra announced the appointment of Valčuha as its next music director, effective with the 2022–2023 season.

Music Directors

Notable musicians, past and present

The following Houston Symphony musicians have articles in Wikipedia:
Arlene Weiss Alda, clarinet, assistant principal 1956–1957
James Austin, trumpet, principal 1960–1977
Edward Carroll, trumpet, associate principal 1975–1976
Wayne Crouse, viola, principal 1951–1983
Willard Somers Elliot, bassoon 1946–1949
Paul Ellison, bass, principal 1964–1987
Armando Ghitalla, trumpet 1948–1950
Desmond Hoebig, cello, principal 1991–2003
Frank Huang, violin, concertmaster 2010–2015
Benjamin Kamins, bassoon, principal 1981–2003
Julie Landsman, horn, co-principal 1982–1985
Cristian Măcelaru, violin 2004–2006
Erik Ralske, horn, associate principal
Beatrice Schroeder Rose, principal harp, 1953-84)
Hal Robinson, bass, assistant principal 1977–1985
Elaine Shaffer, flute, principal 1948–1953
Joseph Silverstein, violin 1950–1953
Brinton Averil Smith, cello, principal 2005–present
Laila Storch, oboe, principal 1948–1955
William VerMeulen, horn, principal 1990–present
John McLaughlin Williams, violin 1981–1982
Harold Wright, clarinet, c. 1949–1952

References

External links
Houston Symphony official website
History from The Handbook of Texas Online
Oral History clip of Ima Hogg discussing the formation of the Houston Symphony from the Houston Area Digital Archive

Culture of Houston
Texas classical music
Music of Houston
Tourist attractions in Houston
Musical groups established in 1913
Orchestras based in Texas
1913 establishments in Texas